Caleb J. Spivak is an American actor, model, and entrepreneur. He is the founder of What Now Atlanta (WNA), a  news resource for openings and closings in Atlanta's restaurants, retail and real estate.

Early life
Born in Upper Heyford, Oxfordshire, England to Air Force veterans Mark Ian and Lisa Hay Spivak, Caleb  and his older brother Joshua Aaron Spivak, began performing  together  on stages while growing up in New York City, Italy and other locations  where  the military work took his family to.

Career
Caleb J. Spivak moved to Atlanta in 2007 and attended Georgia State University pursuing a degree in Theatre and Journalism but later  dropped out to build a career in the film and television industry as the Hollywood enterprise boomed in the South.

In 2010, Caleb founded What Now Atlanta; a news source for restaurant, retail, and multifamily openings and closings in Atlanta while working as Director of Social Media & Emerging Technologies for Commercial Real Estate Developer North American Properties (NAP).
 He first joined NAP in 2011 to develop a Social Media strategy to revitalize Atlantic Station, a failing mixed-use development in Midtown Atlanta.

In early 2015, Caleb began studying the Meisner technique  with actor and acting coach Erin Elizabeth Burns known for her role in Stephen King’s Cell. He also booked his first television role as "Harvey Robinson" in  Your Worst Nightmare; a TV Series documentary produced by Crazy Legs Productions for Investigation Discovery within the same year.

In 2017, Caleb performed the role of  Biometric Operator in the American television series 24: Legacy produced by Twentieth Century Fox for the Fox Network.

Filmography

References

External links

 What Now Atlanta website

Living people
American male film actors
American gay actors
Male models from Georgia (U.S. state)
American business executives
Year of birth missing (living people)
People from Cherwell District
Georgia State University alumni
21st-century American LGBT people